This is a list of players who scored over 100 goals in Eredivisie, Netherlands' top flight football league, during its history starting from the 1956 season.

All-time top scorers

Key
 Bold shows players still playing in Eredivisie.
 Italics show players still playing professional football in other leagues.

See also
List of Eredivisie hat-tricks

References

Netherlands